The 1896–97 United States collegiate men's ice hockey season was the 3rd season of collegiate ice hockey. 

Columbia University and Pennsylvania University fielded teams for the first time but with only four programs in existence most games were played against non-college opponents.

Regular season

Standings

References

1896–97 NCAA Standings

External links
College Hockey Historical Archives

 
College